Microsomal glutathione S-transferase 3 is an enzyme that in humans is encoded by the MGST3 gene.

The MAPEG (Membrane-Associated Proteins in Eicosanoid and Glutathione metabolism) family consists of six human proteins, several of which are involved the production of leukotrienes and prostaglandin E, important mediators of inflammation. This gene encodes an enzyme that catalyzes the conjugation of leukotriene A4 and reduced glutathione to produce leukotriene C4. This enzyme also demonstrates glutathione-dependent peroxidase activity towards lipid hydroperoxides.

Model organisms

Model organisms have been used in the study of MGST3 function. A conditional knockout mouse line, called Mgst3tm1a(KOMP)Wtsi was generated as part of the International Knockout Mouse Consortium program — a high-throughput mutagenesis project to generate and distribute animal models of disease to interested scientists — at the Wellcome Trust Sanger Institute.

Male and female animals underwent a standardized phenotypic screen to determine the effects of deletion. Twenty five tests were carried out on mutant mice but no significant abnormalities were observed.

References

Further reading

Genes mutated in mice